Crug is a Welsh word meaning
barrow, cairn, or hillock. 

It may also refer to:

Places
 Bryn-crug, Wales
 Crug Hywel

Events
 Battle of Crug Mawr

See also
 Krug (disambiguation)